Green Days By The River is a 2017 Trinidadian drama film, directed by Michael Mooleedhar. It is based on the novel of the same name by the Trinidadian author Michael Anthony. Set in 1952 Trinidad, the film follows Shell an ambitious African village boy struggling with poverty and his sick father finds solace in a wealthy Indian farmer, Mr. Gidharee, and his captivating daughter, until he falls for a city girl, and discovers the scheming entrapment of his solace that would shatter his love life and manhood. The film opened at the 2017 Trinidad and Tobago Film Festival.

Cast
 Sudai Tafari - Shellie
 Anand Lawkaran- Mr. Gidharee
 Nadia Nisha Kandhai - Rosalie
 Vanessa Bartholomew - Joan
 Che Rodriguez - Pa Lammy

References

External links
 
 

2017 drama films
English-language Trinidad and Tobago films
2010s English-language films
Trinidad and Tobago drama films